Nicholas Murray (born 18 December 2000) is an Australian rules footballer playing for the Adelaide Football Club in the Australian Football League (AFL). As a junior, Murray played for the Murray Bushrangers and the Greater Western Sydney Giants' reserves team. He was overlooked at the AFL draft for two seasons in a row before being signed to a rookie contract with Adelaide in early 2021 and making his AFL debut less than three weeks later. Murray has since become an integral part of Adelaide's backline.

Early life and career

Murray is the younger brother of Sam Murray, who played 13 AFL matches for Collingwood before Murray began his career. As a junior, Murray played 21 games for the Murray Bushrangers in the NAB League across the 2017 and 2018 seasons, becoming the team's co-captain. He became a member of the Greater Western Sydney Giants academy and played eight games for the Giants' reserves team in 2019 as a key defender.

Murray was overlooked in the 2019 AFL draft and instead signed a contract to play for Williamstown in the Victorian Football League in 2020. Murray played for Williamstown in two practices matches against Port Melbourne Football Club and Footscray, but the 2020 VFL season was cancelled without a game being played due to the COVID-19 pandemic. Murray returned home to play for Ganmain-Grong Grong-Matong in the AFL Riverina Championship, where he was one of the standout performers. He predominantly played at centre-half-forward during the season and kicked 12 goals from seven games. His season came to an end when he injured his collarbone in a final. After he recovered from this injury, he did some pre-season training for 2021 with the Wangaratta Rovers.

Adelaide Football Club

Murray was overlooked for the second year in a row in the 2020 AFL draft, but in December while working at a family friend's farm he was invited to train with the Adelaide Football Club. Adelaide had one spot left open on their list and, unable to decide between Murray and their own delisted player Ayce Taylor, the club decided to give the two players the opportunity to train with the rest of the team during the pre-season to decide which player would join the team's list. Murray won out and signed a rookie contract with the team on 7 March 2021 as part of the pre-season supplemental selection period. Murray played in two pre-season games against Port Adelaide but was unavailable to make his debut in round one. In round two, less than three weeks after he officially joined Adelaide's list, Murray made his AFL debut against Sydney at the Sydney Cricket Ground, where he tagged four-time Coleman Medallist Lance Franklin. Former Adelaide player Stephen Rowe said of Murray's rise to the AFL: "It is remarkable. I doubt there will be a bigger football debut story than this one. Three weeks ago not on a list, six months ago on a tractor playing for a – dare I say – buckle wheel league. It didn't look terribly flash. And now he's playing Buddy [Franklin]..."

Murray's actions near the end of Adelaide's Round 10 game against Melbourne became a source of controversy in the following days. Adelaide had been trailing by 16 points in the final quarter, but took the lead of the match by just one point with 43 seconds remaining thanks to a goal from Taylor Walker. At the following centre bounce, Melbourne midfielder Christian Petracca kicked the ball inside Melbourne's forward fifty, and with 32 seconds left on the clock Murray recovered the ball near the boundary line. Under pressure from Melbourne's Charlie Spargo, Murray handballed the ball with his left hand, knocking the ball out of bounds. The umpires called for the ball to be thrown in, and Adelaide held on until the final siren to win the match by one point. If the umpires had given a free kick against Murray for deliberately handballing the ball out of bounds, Melbourne would have had a chance to either level the scores or take the lead. The game was Melbourne's first loss of the season, and ended an eleven-game winning streak. Commentators, including former AFL players Kane Cornes and Jason Dunstall, believed that a free kick should have been paid to Melbourne, but Murray's teammate Tom Doedee disagreed, saying, "I was ready to take it; it wasn't deliberate. Nick Murray obviously made a good decision to handball it to a particular spot and I was right there and ready to take it ... It wasn't deliberate." Later in the night, Fox Footy broadcast footage of a new angle which appeared to show that Spargo's hand had come into contact with the ball, deflecting it and causing the ball to go out of bounds. The Monday after the game, the AFL released a statement saying that a free kick should have been given to Melbourne because Murray "did not display sufficient intent to keep the ball in play."

Alongside fellow rookie Jordon Butts, Murray became an important part of the Crows' backline. In July, after playing just eight AFL games, the Crows gave him a two-year contract extension to keep him at the club until the end of 2023. Through the 2021 season, Murray played for Adelaide in a total of thirteen games, averaging nearly six spoils per game.

Statistics

Updated to the end of the 2022 AFL season.

|-
| 2021 ||  || 28 || 13 || 1 || 1 || 70 || 20 || 90 || 29 || 18 || 0.08 || 0.08 || 5.38 || 1.54 || 6.92 || 2.23 || 1.38
|-
| 2022 ||  || 28 || 16 || 0 || 0 || 87 || 40 || 127 || 44 || 21 || 0.00 || 0.00 || 5.44 || 2.50 || 7.94 || 2.75 || 1.31
|- class=sortbottom
! colspan=3 | Career
! 29 !! 1 !! 1 !! 157 !! 60 !! 217 !! 73 !! 39 !! 0.03 !! 0.03 !! 5.41 !! 2.07 !! 7.48 !! 2.52 !! 1.34
|}

Notes and References

Notes

References

 Adelaide Football Club players
 2000 births
 Living people
 Australian rules footballers from New South Wales